Rippin' Riders Snowboarding, also known as Cool Boarders Burrrn in Japan and Snow Surfers in Europe, is a snowboard game developed by UEP Systems, the creators of the Cool Boarders series. It was released in 1999 for the Dreamcast.

Regional differences
Rippin' Riders was originally released in Japan under the name Cool Boarders Burrrn. For the US release, UEP opted to release the Cool Boarders sequel under the name Rippin' Riders Snowboarding. This was due to the U.S. rights to the Cool Boarders name being owned by Sony Computer Entertainment whose 989 Studios (a now defunct division of Sony Computer Entertainment America) published the US releases of Cool Boarders 3 and Cool Boarders 4 for the PlayStation.

Reception

The game received "average" reviews according to the review aggregation website GameRankings. Adam Pavlacka of NextGen said that the game was "just Cool Boarders on Dreamcast, albeit with a few new tracks and an excellent graphics upgrade. While enjoyable, it's still decidedly average." In Japan, Famitsu gave it a score of 30 out of 40.

Notes

References

External links

1999 video games
Dreamcast games
Dreamcast-only games
Sega video games
Single-player video games
Snowboarding video games
UEP Systems games
Video games developed in Japan